Neolepetopsidae is a family of small deep sea  sea snails or true limpets, marine gastropod mollusks in the subclass Patellogastropoda (according to the taxonomy of the Gastropoda by Bouchet & Rocroi, 2005).

This family has no subfamilies.

Etymology 
The name of the family Neolepetopsidae is composed of the prefix neo, which means "new", and the word Lepetopsidae, which is the name of an extinct family of true limpets, from which the species within Neolepetopsidae probably evolved.

Taxonomy 
Two Neolepetosidae species Eulepetopsis vitrea and Paralepetopsis floridensis were genetically analyzed by Harasewych & McArthur (2000), who confirmed placement of Neolepetopsidae within Acmaeoidea/Lottioidea based on analysis of partial 18S rDNA.

Neolepetopsidae belongs to superfamily Neolepetopsoidea according to the taxonomy of the Gastropoda by Bouchet & Rocroi, 2005).

Neolepetopsoidea was synonymized with Lottioidea so Neolepetopsidae was moved to superfamily Lottioidea in World Register of Marine Species.

Distribution 
The distribution of the Neolepetopsidae includes the Northeastern Pacific, the western Pacific (Paralepetopsis rosemariae) and the Mid-Atlantic Ridge.

Habitat 
These limpets live in the deep sea. Their habitat includes hydrothermal vents, whalebone (baleen) and whale-fall habitats.

Genera 
There are currently known 3 genera and altogether 12 species in Neolepetopsidae:
 Neolepetopsis McLean, 1990 - type genus
 Neolepetopsis gordensis McLean, 1990 - type species
 Neolepetopsis densata McLean, 1990
 Neolepetopsis nicolasensis McLean, 2008 - from whalebone
 Neolepetopsis verruca McLean, 1990
 Neolepetopsis occulta McLean, 1990
 Eulepetopsis McLean, 1990 - monotypic genus
 Eulepetopsis vitrea McLean, 1990
 Paralepetopsis McLean, 1990
 Paralepetopsis floridensis McLean 1990 - type species
 Paralepetopsis clementensis McLean, 2008 - from whalebone
 Paralepetopsis ferrugivora Warén & Bouchet, 2001
 Paralepetopsis lepichoni Warén & Bouchet, 2001 - from Nankai Trench
 Paralepetopsis rosemariae Beck, 1996
 Paralepetopsis sasakii Warén & Bouchet, 2009
 Paralepetopsis tunnicliffae McLean, 2008 - from hydrothermal vent

References

Further reading 
 Sasaki T. & Warén A. (2007). "Anatomy of Eulepetopsis vitrea McLean, 1990 (Patellogastropoda: Neolepetopsidae)". In: Jordaens, K., N. Van Houtte, J. Van Geothem, & T. Backeljau, editors. Abstracts, World congress of malacology. Antwerp, Belgium. July 15–20, 2007195.